In baseball statistics, a relief pitcher is credited with a game finished (denoted by GF) if he is the last pitcher to pitch for his team in a game. A starting pitcher is not credited with a GF for pitching a complete game. 

Mariano Rivera is the all-time leader in games finished with 952. Rivera is the only pitcher in MLB history to finish more than 900 career games. Trevor Hoffman and Lee Smith are the only other pitchers to finish more than 800 games in their careers.

Key

List

Stats updated as of the end of the 2022 season.

Notes

References

External links

Major League Baseball

Finished
Major League Baseball statistics